Louisville is a city in and the county seat of Jefferson County, Georgia, United States, and also a former state capital of Georgia. It is located southwest of Augusta on the Ogeechee River, and its population was 2,493 at the 2010 census, down from 2,712 at the 2000 census. Its name is pronounced "Lewis-ville", though it and the differently pronounced city in Kentucky were both named for Louis XVI.

History 

Louisville was incorporated on January 26, 1786, as the prospective state capital, though it did not become so for a decade. Savannah had served as the colonial capital, but was considered too far from the center of population in the growing state, and Augusta became the state capital in the 1780s. 

Louisville was named for Louis XVI, who had aided the Continentals during the American Revolutionary War and was still the King of France when the decision to incorporate the city was made. Development of the city took years, and its state government buildings were completed in 1795. An old Revolutionary War soldiers' cemetery is located on the western side of town.

The city of Louisville served as the state capital of Georgia from 1796 to 1806. It was a center of trade, legislators, and political influence. The Jefferson County courthouse, built in 1904, stands on the site of Georgia's first permanent capitol building.

Louisville's historic open-sided market house, Old Market, (Old Slave Market) still stands in the center of downtown. The original market had sections for sales of farm produce, household goods, and enslaved African Americans. The caption of a 1934 photograph in the Library of Congress proves the sale of enslaved people of color happened at this market, with details. The Old Market is listed on the National Register of Historic Places. Roads and other transportation routes intersected at the market square, the hub of the region when the town was the state capital. The state capital was moved to Milledgeville and later to Atlanta, in the Piedmont.

As a small city and county seat, Louisville now has few major businesses and industries. A marker dedicated to the Yazoo land scandal of the 19th century is located in front of the Jefferson County Courthouse. Queensborough National Bank and Trust Company was founded in 1902 and is currently headquartered in Louisville, on U.S. Highway 1.

Geography
Louisville is located slightly south of the center of Jefferson County. U.S. Route 1 passes through the east side of the city, leading northeast  to Augusta and south  to Swainsboro. U.S. Route 221 passes through the north side of downtown as Peachtree Street and leads southwest  to Bartow. US-221 leaves Louisville to the north, running with US-1  to Wrens before continuing north toward Harlem.

The western city boundary follows Rocky Comfort Creek, which flows into the Ogeechee River at the city limits' southwest corner. The Ogeechee flows to the Atlantic Ocean south of Savannah.

Demographics

2020 census

As of the 2020 United States census, there were 2,381 people, 897 households, and 606 families residing in the city.

2000 census
As of the census of 2000, there were 2,712 people, 994 households, and 664 families residing in the city. The racial makeup of the city was 65.93% African American, 33.63% White, 0.04% Native American, 0.22% Asian, 0.07% from other races, and 0.11% from two or more races. Hispanic or Latino of any race were 0.37% of the population.

There were 994 households, out of which 33.4% had children under the age of 18 living with them, 35.8% were married couples living together, 27.4% had a female householder with no husband present, and 33.1% were non-families. 31.4% of all households were made up of individuals, and 16.1% had someone living alone who was 65 years of age or older.  The average household size was 2.56 and the average family size was 3.22.

In the city, the population was spread out, with 28.2% under the age of 18, 8.3% from 18 to 24, 25.1% from 25 to 44, 19.9% from 45 to 64, and 18.5% who were 65 years of age or older.  The median age was 37 years. For every 100 females, there were 77.7 males.  For every 100 females age 18 and over, there were 71.8 males.

The median income for a household in the city was $19,883, and the median income for a family was $32,578. Males had a median income of $31,500 versus $16,921 for females. The per capita income for the city was $15,028.  About 23.1% of families and 28.9% of the population were below the poverty line, including 27.8% of those under age 18 and 51.8% of those age 65 or over.

Education

Jefferson County School District 
The Jefferson County School District holds pre-school to grade twelve, and consists of two elementary schools, two middle schools, a high school, and an academy school. The district has 199 full-time teachers and over 3,526 students.
Louisville Academy
Carver Elementary School
Wrens Elementary School
Jefferson County Middle School
Jefferson County High School

Private education 
Thomas Jefferson Academy

See also 

 Central Savannah River Area
 List of municipalities in Georgia (U.S. state)
 Local radio station: WPEH, Big Peach Radio (92.1 FM and 1420 AM)
 National Register of Historic Places listings in Jefferson County, Georgia

References

Further reading

External links 

 Government

 General information

Louisville, Georgia at the Digital Library of Georgia
Louisville, Georgia at Jefferson County Chamber of Commerce and Development Authority of Jefferson County (jeffersoncounty.org)
Louisville, Georgia at New Georgia Encyclopedia
Louisville Public Library at Jefferson County Library System
The Sacking of Louisville at The Historical Marker Database (HMdb.org)

1786 establishments in Georgia (U.S. state)
Cities in Georgia (U.S. state)
Cities in Jefferson County, Georgia
County seats in Georgia (U.S. state)
Georgia
Planned cities in the United States
Populated places established in 1786
Former state capitols in the United States